Papenburg (Ems) is a railway station located in Papenburg, Lower Saxony, Germany. The station lies on the Emsland Railway (Rheine - Norddeich) and the train services are operated by Deutsche Bahn and WestfalenBahn. In the 1850s the station was built as part of the Hannoversche Westbahn. The track between Papenburg and Emden was opened in 1854.

Train services
The station is served by the following service(s):

Intercity services (IC 35) Norddeich - Emden - Münster - Düsseldorf - Köln - Bonn - Koblenz - Mainz - Mannheim - Stuttgart
Intercity services (IC 35) Norddeich - Emden - Münster - Düsseldorf - Köln - Bonn - Koblenz - Mainz - Mannheim - Karlsruhe - Konstanz
Regional services  Emden - Leer - Lingen - Rheine - Münster

References

External links
 

Railway stations in Lower Saxony
Railway stations in Germany opened in 1854